Carl Vincenz Schindler (23 October 1821 in Vienna – 22 August 1842 in Laab im Walde) was an Austrian military painter in the Biedermeier style. He was sometimes referred to as "Soldaten-Schindler" (Soldier Schindler).

Life 
He received his first lessons from his father, the painter and engraver , who also encouraged his interest in military subjects.

Later, he took private lessons from his father's friend, Peter Fendi. It was Fendi who introduced him to the works of the French military painters, Hippolyte Bellangé, Nicolas Toussaint Charlet, Eugène Lami and Auguste Raffet. In 1839, he had his first exhibition at the academy.

He was suffering from tuberculosis and his health was fragile, so he had to interrupt his studies several times. He visited Laab im Walde, to try the "water cure", but it was to no avail and he died there at the age of twenty-one.

Rather than portray battle scenes or heroic acts, he preferred to focus on the soldiers' daily lives, creating a link between military art and genre painting. His works influenced  and August von Pettenkofen.

Selected paintings

References

Further reading 
 Franz Martin Haberditzl, Heinrich Schwarz: Carl Schindler. Sein Leben und sein Werk., Österreichische Staatsdruckerei, Vienna 1930

External links 

 
 Two more paintings @ Austria-Forum
 Carl Schindler @ the Niederösterreich Landesmuseum

1821 births
1842 deaths
19th-century Austrian painters
Austrian male painters
Academy of Fine Arts Vienna alumni
Artists from Vienna
19th-century deaths from tuberculosis
Military art
19th-century Austrian male artists
Tuberculosis deaths in Austria